Ayşedeniz Gökçin (born January 4, 1988; anglicised as "AyseDeniz Gokcin") is a Turkish classical pianist and composer.

After graduating in 2009 with a bachelor's degree from Eastman School of Music, Gökçin completed a master's degree at the Royal Academy of Music in 2011.

She is known for recording an EP of her arrangements for solo piano of the music of the rock band Pink Floyd in the style of Franz Liszt, Pink Floyd Lisztified. The EP comprises three tracks, which, she says, form a fantasia. These are:

 "Hey You"
 "Wish You Were Here"
 "Another Brick in the Wall"

The first and third being from the 1979 album The Wall, the middle one the eponymous 1975 Wish You Were Here.

Gökçin describes her arrangement of Another Brick... as being inspired by Liszt's 'Dante Sonata'.

She has also recorded an album of reworkings of the music of Ástor Piazzolla.

Her album The Nirvana Project, launched in November 2015, is a virtuoso piano re-working of famous Nirvana songs, in collaboration with Bulgarian music producer and DJ Ivan Shopov.

Discography

Albums

Singles and EPs

References

External links 
 Official website

Living people
1988 births
Turkish pianists
Turkish women pianists
Eastman School of Music alumni
Alumni of the Royal Academy of Music
21st-century pianists
21st-century women pianists